Ry is an abbreviation for railway and relay.

Ry, RY, or ry may also refer to:

People

First name
 Ry Bradley (born 1980), American singer and musician
 Ry Cooder (born 1947), American musician
 Ry Nikonova (1942–2014), Russian artist
 Ry Rocklen (born 1978), American artist
 Ry Russo-Young (born 1981), American filmmaker
 RY X (born 1988), Australian musician
 Ryland Rose, Australian rapper formerly known as Ry

Surname
 Paul du Ry (1640–1714), French architect
 Simon Louis du Ry (1726–1799), French architect and grandson of Paul du Ry
 Na Ry (born 1985), South Korean beauty queen
 Trần Thị Hoa Ry (born 1976), Vietnamese politician

Places

Denmark
 Ry, Denmark, town in Jutland
 Ry train station
 Ry Municipality, former municipality in Jutland

France
 Auzouville-sur-Ry, commune in Normandy
 Grainville-sur-Ry, commune in Normandy
 Ry, Seine-Maritime, administrative division in Normandy

Science and technology
 Rydberg constant, unit of energy used in quantum physics related to the ground state energy of the hydrogen atom
 Consolidated RY, former cargo aircraft of the U.S. Navy
 RY Sagittarii, star in the constellation Sagittarius
 RY Tauri, star in the constellation Taurus
 RY (test signal), character string used to test five-level teleprinter channels

Business and finance 

 Rekisteröity yhdistys ('ry' or 'ry.'), a Finnish non-profit organization
 Royal Bank of Canada (stock symbol RY on tsx2 and nyse2)

Other
 Operation RY, Japanese plan to invade South Pacific islands during World War II
 "Ry Tanindrazanay malala ô!", national anthem of Madagascar

See also
 RI (disambiguation)